Gabija Toropovaitė (born 28 January 2002) is a Lithuanian footballer who plays as a midfielder and has appeared for the Lithuania women's national team for ŠSG-FA Šiauliai in the A Lyga (women).

Career
Toropovaitė has been capped for the Lithuania national team, appearing for the team during the UEFA Women's Euro 2021 qualifying cycle.

References

External links
 
 
 

2002 births
Living people
Lithuanian women's footballers
Lithuania women's international footballers
Women's association football midfielders
Gintra Universitetas players